Mitch Wahl (born January 22, 1990) is an American professional ice hockey player who is currently an unrestricted free agent. He most recently played with Schwenninger Wild Wings of the Deutsche Eishockey Liga (DEL). He was selected in the second round (48th overall) of the 2008 NHL Entry Draft by the Calgary Flames.

Wahl played four years of junior hockey with the Spokane Chiefs of the Western Hockey League (WHL), winning the WHL championship and Memorial Cup in 2008. He was named a First Team All-Star by the WHL in 2009–10 before turning professional at the conclusion of his junior season. He was a member of the American junior team at the 2009 World Junior Ice Hockey Championships.

Personal
Wahl grew up in Seal Beach, California. His parents, Mitch Sr. and Michelle, knew little about hockey but enrolled him in the sport after he showed an aptitude for skating during a birthday party for his elder sister. He began playing at the age of six, and credits the arrival of Wayne Gretzky with the Los Angeles Kings for creating opportunities for himself and other players in southern California. Wahl is also an avid surfer.

Playing career
Wahl played minor hockey with the California Wave, and caught the attention of WHL scouts while playing in tournaments in Vancouver, Kamloops and Medicine Hat. He was selected in the first round, fourth overall, by the Spokane Chiefs in the 2005 WHL Bantam Draft. After appearing in two games with the Chiefs in 2005–06, Wahl joined the team full-time in 2006–07, scoring 16 goals and 48 points in 69 games. He improved to 73 points in 2007–08, and added 14 points in 21 playoff games as the Chiefs won the Ed Chynoweth Cup as league champions. At the 2008 Memorial Cup tournament, Wahl scored six points in four games to help the Chiefs win the Canadian Hockey League (CHL) championship.

Wahl's success attracted the attention of the Calgary Flames, who selected him with their second pick, 48th overall, at the 2008 NHL Entry Draft. He also joined the United States men's national junior ice hockey team for the 2009 World Junior Ice Hockey Championships, scoring four points for the fifth place Americans. He finished the 2008–09 WHL season with 32 goals and 63 points. In 2009–10, he finished sixth in league scoring with 96 points and was named a First Team All-Star by the WHL. He ended his WHL career in sixth place all-time in scoring for the Chiefs with 284 points and third all-time in assists with 186. The team also named him one of the top 25 players in their first 25 seasons. Upon the conclusion of his WHL season, Wahl joined the Flames's AHL affiliate, the Abbotsford Heat. He played in four regular season games, scoring a goal and three assists, and remained with the team into the 2010 Calder Cup playoffs.

He was traded to the Philadelphia Flyers on February 25, 2013 for Mike Testwuide. The Flyers did not tender him a qualifying offer in the off-season, making him an unrestricted free agent.

On August 5, 2013, Wahl signed his first European contract as a free agent, agreeing to a one-year deal with Austrian club, EC Red Bull Salzburg of the EBEL.

On June 25, 2014, Wahl agreed to a one-year contract with the Florida Everblades of the ECHL. After producing 59 points in 53 games with the Everblades in the 2014–15 season, Wahl returned to Europe to sign a one-year contract with Swedish second division club, IK Oskarshamn of the Allsvenskan on July 1, 2015.

On May 27, 2022, Wahl continued his European journeyman career, agreeing to a one-year contract to remain in Germany with the Schwenninger Wild Wings of the DEL for the 2022–23 season. Wahl made 22 regular season appearances with the Wild Wings, collecting 1 goals and 6 points. Unable to help Schwenninger advance to the post-season, it was announced Wahl would leave the club at the conclusion of his contract on March 9, 2022.

Career statistics

Regular season and playoffs

International

Awards and honors

References

External links

1990 births
Living people
Abbotsford Heat players
Adirondack Phantoms players
American expatriate ice hockey players in Austria
American men's ice hockey centers
HC '05 Banská Bystrica players
Calgary Flames draft picks
ETC Crimmitschau players
Fischtown Pinguins players
Florida Everblades players
Hamilton Bulldogs (AHL) players
Ice hockey players from California
Idaho Steelheads (ECHL) players
HC TWK Innsbruck players
EC KAC players
Kassel Huskies players
IK Oskarshamn players
People from Seal Beach, California
EC Red Bull Salzburg players
Schwenninger Wild Wings players
Spokane Chiefs players
Utah Grizzlies (ECHL) players
Utica Comets players
Västerviks IK players
American expatriate ice hockey players in Canada
American expatriate ice hockey players in Sweden
American expatriate ice hockey players in Slovakia
American expatriate ice hockey players in Finland
American expatriate ice hockey players in Germany